Xandão is a hypocorism of the name Alexandre, and means "Big Alexander" or "Alexander Sr." in Portuguese. Xandão may refer to:

Alexandre de Moraes, a Brazilian jurist and a judge at the Brazilian Supreme Federal Court
Xandão (footballer, born 1988), Brazilian football defender
Xandão (footballer, born 1990), Brazilian football defender
Alexandre Menezes, Brazilian guitarist known as Xandão